Lars Eilstrup Rasmussen is a Danish computer scientist, technology executive, and the co-founder of Google Maps. He was the director of engineering for Facebook in London. In early 2003, Lars and his brother Jens co-founded a mapping-related startup, Where 2 Technologies, which was acquired by Google in October 2004. Rasmussen became the head of the Google Maps team and worked at Google until joining Facebook in late 2010.

Qualifications
In 1990, Rasmussen graduated from the University of Aarhus with a degree in Computer Science and Mathematics. He gained his MSc in Computer Systems Engineering from the University of Edinburgh in 1992.

Rasmussen began his PhD, working with Mark Jerrum and Alistair Sinclair in the Laboratory for Foundations of Computer Science at Edinburgh, then moved, with Sinclair, to Berkeley, California, USA.

He received his PhD from the University of California, Berkeley in 1998, for his thesis "On Approximating the Permanent and Other #P-Complete Problems".

Where 2 Technologies and Google Maps
In 2003, Lars and his brother, Jens, with Australians Noel Gordon and Stephen Ma, co-founded Where 2 Technologies, a mapping-related start-up in Sydney, Australia. This company was bought by Google in October 2004, to create Google Maps. The four of them were subsequently employed by Google in the engineering team at the company's Australian office in Sydney.  Lars and Jens are also the originators of the Google Wave project.

Facebook
On 29 October 2010, Rasmussen announced that he had left Google, and was moving to San Francisco to work for Facebook. At Facebook he was, among other things, the engineering director for the Facebook Graph Search project which is a semantic search engine for the social network. In 2013 he and Tom Stocky were listed as number 79 in The 100 Biggest Stars In Silicon Valley by Business Insider. Rasmussen had been working in the Facebook London office.

Music start-up
On 27 April 2015 Rasmussen announced his departure from Facebook to co-found a music start-up Weav Music Inc with his partner Elomida Visviki.
Lars Rasmussen has since moved to Athens and became an angel investor.

Awards
On 19 October 2010, Lars and Jens Rasmussen were awarded the Pearcey Award for NSW ICT Entrepreneurs of the Year.

In 2020, Rasmussen was named the recipient of the Green Oaks, Libertyville, Mundelein, Vernon Hills Chamber of Commerce second annual Stephanie Smith-Howard Volunteer Heart Award.

Investments
Rasmussen has made personal investments in a number of technology startups including Canva, an online design tool; and Posse, a point of interest-based recommendation service.

References 

Living people
Google employees
Facebook employees
Aarhus University alumni
UC Berkeley College of Engineering alumni
Alumni of the University of Edinburgh
Danish computer scientists
Danish expatriates in the United States
Danish expatriates in the United Kingdom
Danish company founders
Danish expatriates in Australia
Year of birth missing (living people)